Gérard Gaudron (born 26 May 1949) is a member of the National Assembly of France.  He represents the Seine-Saint-Denis department, and is a member of the Union for a Popular Movement.

References

1949 births
Living people
People from Jura (department)
Politicians from Bourgogne-Franche-Comté
Rally for the Republic politicians
Union for a Popular Movement politicians
Deputies of the 13th National Assembly of the French Fifth Republic
Members of Parliament for Seine-Saint-Denis
Mayors of places in Île-de-France